The 1921 Pittsburgh mayoral election was held on Tuesday, November 8, 1921. Republican nominee William A. Magee was elected by a large margin over Democratic candidate William N. McNair.

Background
The 1921 election was the last election under a law that prohibited mayors of Pittsburgh from serving consecutive terms. This law precluded incumbent mayor Edward V. Babcock from running for re-election.

The nonpartisan election law governing the previous two mayoral elections was repealed, bringing an end to the nonpartisan blanket primary and a return to the party system.

Republican primary
Former mayor William A. Magee, who had run for a non-consecutive second term in 1917 but lost to Babcock, ran yet again and won the Republican nomination over Joseph N. Mackrell. Magee's victory was aided by a truce in an ongoing feud with Republican boss and "Maker of Mayors" Max Leslie.

General election
In the November general election, Magee easily defeated Democratic candidate William N. McNair. McNair would be elected mayor twelve years later, ushering in an era of Democratic dominance in city politics.

McNair was also the nominee of the Prohibition and "Lincoln" parties.

References

1921
1921 United States mayoral elections
1920s in Pittsburgh
November 1921 events
1921 Pennsylvania elections